The Lochis Madonna is a c.1475 tempera on panel painting by Giovanni Bellini, now in the Accademia Carrara in Bergamo. It is signed IOANNES BELLINVS on a small scroll attached to the marble balustrade in the lower foreground. It dates from early in the painter's mature phase, although he was still influenced by Andrea Mantegna's sculptural approach to drapery in the painting.

References

1475 paintings
Paintings of the Madonna and Child by Giovanni Bellini
Collections of the Accademia Carrara